Hévíz Futball Club is a professional football club based in Hévíz, Zala County, Hungary, that competes in the Nemzeti Bajnokság III, the third tier of Hungarian football.

Name changes
1949–51: Hévízi Egyetértés SE
1951–55: Hévízi Lendület SK
1955: Hévízi Petőfi Sport Egyesület
1955–57: Hévízi Bástya
1959–70: Hévízi KISZ Falusi SK
1970–72: defunct
1998-99: Hévízi SK
1999: merger with Zalaapáti
1999–00: Royal Goldavis Hévíz FC
2000–present: Hévíz Futball Club

External links
 Official website of Hévíz FC 
 Profile on Magyar Futball

References

Football clubs in Hungary
Association football clubs established in 1949
1949 establishments in Hungary